Rallis, Ralli or Ralles is the name of an old Greek Phanariote family, whose members played important political role in the history of modern Greece, Danubian Principalities and later in the United Kingdom. One branch of the family, living in Great Britain, gained the title of Baronet in 1912 and thus became the Ralli baronets. They claim descent from the Frankish-Byzantine noble Raoul/Ralles family.

From the Athenian branch
Dimitrios Rallis (1844–1921), Prime Minister of Greece 1897
Georgios Rallis (1918–2006), Prime Minister of Greece 1980–1981
Ioannis Rallis (1878–1946), Prime Minister of Greece 1943–1944

From the Chios branch
 Ralli Brothers, expatriate Greek family and merchant business in Victorian-era England
 Pandeli Ralli (1845–1928), British Member of Parliament
 Ralli baronets, title in the Baronetage of the United Kingdom, created in 1912 for Lucas Ralli
 Théodore Ralli (1852–1909), Greek-French orientalist painter
 Loukas Ralli (c.1794–1879), Mayor of Piraeus 1855–1866
 Constantine Scaramanga-Ralli (1854-1934), author and British Member of Parliament

Other people
 Aldo Ralli (1935–2016), Italian actor
 Dionysus Rallis, Metropolitan of Tarnovo and leader of the First Tarnovo Uprising
 Evangelos Rallis, Greek tennis player who competed at the 1896 Summer Olympics in Athens
 Giovanna Ralli (born 1935), Italian actress
 Sophia Ralli (born 1988), Greek alpine skier who competed at the 2010 Winter Olympics
 Stephen Rallis (1942–2012), American mathematician
 Zamfir Ralli-Arbore (1848–1933), Romanian political activist

See also
 Ralli (disambiguation)
 Rallis Kopsidis (1929–2010), Greek painter and writer

Greek-language surnames
Surnames